Palaeocephala is a genus of fungi. This is a monotypic genus, containing the single species Palaeocephala cymatelloides, described by Rolf Singer in 1962. According to the Dictionary of the Fungi, the genus is classified in either the Marasmiaceae or Physalacriaceae families; the taxonomical database MycoBank includes it in the Marasmiaceae.

See also

 List of Marasmiaceae genera

References

Marasmiaceae
Monotypic Agaricales genera
Taxa named by Rolf Singer